Daniel John Willett (born 3 October 1987) is an English professional golfer who plays on the European Tour. In April 2016, he won his first major championship at the 2016 Masters Tournament, becoming only the second Englishman to achieve the feat and the first European in 17 years to win at Augusta National.

Early life
Willett was born in Sheffield, Yorkshire, the third of four boys. His father, Steve, was a Church of England vicar and his mother, Swedish-born Elisabet, was a maths teacher. Willett used to practise his golf in a sheep pasture; interviewed by The Daily Telegraph in 2016 he said, "We used to go to Anglesey to play a par three course in the middle of a sheep field." He was a member of Birley Wood Golf Club in his youth.

Amateur career
As an amateur and member of Rotherham Golf Club (RGC), he won the English Amateur Championship in 2007 and competed in the 2007 Walker Cup at Royal County Down In acknowledgement of his achievements he was given life membership of RGC by the then Captain Michael E Stubley and fellow Directors of RGC. In March 2008 he became the number one ranked amateur in the world.

Willett secured a golf scholarship at Jacksonville State University (JSU) in Alabama. During his time with JSU, he was the 2006 Ohio Valley Conference Freshman of the Year and won medallist honours at the 2007 OVC Championship. He was a first-team All-OVC performer and a member of the OVC's All-Tournament Team in both seasons.

Professional career

2008–15 
Willett turned professional in May 2008, and earned his European Tour card for the 2009 season coming through qualifying school. Following a successful 2009, finishing 58th in the inaugural Race to Dubai with eight top-10s, Willett challenged at the 2010 BMW PGA Championship, taking the first-round lead before falling off the pace and finishing outright fifth, winning 190,800 euros. Following this performance, Willett moved into the top 100 of the Official World Golf Ranking for the first time. He finished the 2010 season ranked 23rd on the Order of Merit.

2011 proved to be a less successful season, with only one top ten placement in 30 competitions; he still managed to retain his tour membership comfortably with a final 91st place in the Order of Merit.

Willett's first victory on the European Tour came in June 2012 at the BMW International Open in Cologne. He defeated Marcus Fraser on the fourth extra hole of a sudden death play-off. In the same season he collected a second place at the Omega European Masters, a third place at the Maybank Malaysian Open and three additional top-ten finishes, that gave him the 23rd position at the final Order of Merit.

In 2013 and 2014 Willett established himself as one of the leading European players in the European Tour and in 2015 alone he collected seven top-ten finishes, and ended the year in 25th place in The Race to Dubai.

In December 2014 Willett won the Nedbank Golf Challenge in Sun City, South Africa and, with a third place at the 2015 WGC-Cadillac Match Play in May 2015, he earned a special temporary membership on the PGA Tour for the remainder of the 2015 season.

Through 36 holes at the 2015 Open Championship, Willett was one stroke off the lead of Dustin Johnson and was paired with him in the final group for the third round of the Championship. He only could muster an even-par 72 in the third round, however, and dropped down the leaderboard. A final round 70, moved him into a tie for sixth at the Old Course at St Andrews, his best finish in a major to that point.

In July 2015, Willett won his third European Tour title with a one-stroke victory over Matt Fitzpatrick at the Omega European Masters. Though he earned enough to qualify for a PGA Tour card, Willett declined to take PGA Tour membership for the 2015–16 season.

2016: Masters victory
Willett won his first major championship at the 2016 Masters Tournament at Augusta National after shooting a five-under-par round of 67 to take advantage of a collapse by Jordan Spieth. Defending champion Spieth led by five shots as he approached the 10th hole of the final round. Willett took the lead when Spieth, who was leading by 1 shot from Willett, had a quadruple bogey 7 at the par-3 12th. Willett was the leader in the clubhouse at −5 when he posted a bogey-free final round of 67 and was crowned champion when Spieth finished at −2 alongside Lee Westwood. Willett became the first British player to win the Masters for 20 years, Nick Faldo having won in 1996. After being presented with the green jacket as champion, Willett said: "It was a very surreal day when you look back at the ebbs and flows." After his win, Willett accepted PGA Tour membership and rose to the 9th place of the Official World Golf Ranking.

Beside the first major win at the Masters, 2016 proved to be the most successful season for Willett. He collected his fourth win on the European Tour in February at the Dubai Desert Classic, and had a 2nd place at the 2016 Italian Open and a 3rd place at the BMW PGA Championship, establishing himself early in the season as leader of the Race to Dubai. With his position he also earned the automatic selection for the 2016 Ryder Cup.

Willett's Ryder Cup debut started with a controversy stirred by his brother Peter Willett in a National Club Golfer article in which he stated that "for the Americans to stand a chance of winning, they need their baying mob of imbeciles to caress their egos every step of the way"; Danny Willett successively distanced himself and apologised for his brother's comments, although he later defended his brother's comments as correct after the competition had completed. In the event, he played three matches without earning a point. In the Friday afternoon fourballs he teamed up with Martin Kaymer, losing by 5 and 4 to Brandt Snedeker and Brooks Koepka, on Saturday, he paired with Lee Westwood against J. B. Holmes and Ryan Moore in a 1 up loss in the fourballs; in the Sunday singles he lost again, by 5 and 4, to Koepka.

2017
Seeking his first victory since his Masters win, Willett entered the final round of the 2017 Maybank Championship in Malaysia, with a three-stroke advantage over the field. In the final round, he was the only player in top 29 positions to shoot over par and finished in a tie for fifth, four strokes behind eventual winner, Fabrizio Zanotti.

In defence of his Masters title, Willett shot opening rounds of 73 and 78 for a total of seven-over-par. He missed the cut by one stroke, becoming the first defending champion to do so since Mike Weir in 2004.

Willett struggled with a back injury throughout the season, withdrawing from three tournaments, and ultimately lost his PGA Tour privileges having failed to make the required fifteen starts.

2018
Willett began the 2018 season with nine missed cuts and a withdrawal in his first twelve tournaments. After the 2018 BMW PGA Championship, Willett fell to 462nd in the Official World Golf Ranking. However, his play improved in the second half of the season. This culminated in a victory at the 2018 DP World Tour Championship, Dubai on 18 November 2018. The victory was part of the Rolex Series and worth $1,333,330.

2019
On 22 September, Willett won the BMW PGA Championship at Wentworth Golf Club in England. This win at the European Tour's flagship event brought Willett back into the top 50 of the Official World Golf Ranking.

2020
In the 2019–20 PGA Tour season, shortened due to the COVID-19 pandemic, Willett recorded one top-10 with a tied-fourth finish at the Rocket Mortgage Classic.

2021
In March, Willett recorded a top-10 at the Corales Puntacana Resort and Club Championship. Later in May, he hosted the Betfred British Masters at The Belfry, which was won by Richard Bland. In October, he won the Alfred Dunhill Links Championship by two shots ahead of Tyrrell Hatton and Joakim Lagergren.

2022
Willett was one of a number of players to regain PGA Tour privileges after others who joined LIV Golf were removed from the FedEx Cup standings. In September, Willett started the 2022–23 PGA Tour season at the Fortinet Championship. Holding a one shot lead on the final hole, Willett three-putted the final green for bogey, while Max Homa chipped in for birdie, ultimately giving Homa the title.

Personal life
Willett married Nicole Harris in 2013. They reside in Rotherham, Yorkshire. Their first child, a son, was born in 2016, just a few days before his victory at the 2016 Masters.  Their second child was born in 2018. Willett has described his father, Steve, as the best sports psychologist he has known. Willett is a supporter of Premier League club Liverpool.
Willett is a member of Lindrick Golf Club.

Amateur wins
2007 Yorkshire Amateur, English Amateur
2008 Australian Amateur Stroke Play Championship, Spanish International Amateur Championship

Professional wins (8)

PGA Tour wins (1)

European Tour wins (8)

1Co-sanctioned by the Sunshine Tour
2Co-sanctioned by the Asian Tour
 The DP World Tour Championship, Dubai and BMW PGA Championship are also Rolex Series tournaments.

European Tour playoff record (1–0)

Major championships

Wins (1)

Results timeline

CUT = missed the half-way cut
WD = withdrew
"T" = tied
NT = No tournament due to COVID-19 pandemic

Summary

Most consecutive cuts made – 6 (2015 Open Championship – 2016 PGA)
Longest streak of top-10s – 1 (three times)

Results in The Players Championship

WD = withdrew
CUT = missed the halfway cut
"T" = tied
C = Cancelled after the first round due to the COVID-19 pandemic

Results in World Golf Championships
Results not in chronological order prior to 2015.

1Cancelled due to COVID-19 pandemic

QF, R16, R32, R64 = Round in which player lost in match play
NT = No tournament
"T" = tied

Team appearances
Amateur
European Boys' Team Championship (representing England): 2005
Jacques Léglise Trophy (representing Great Britain & Ireland): 2005
Walker Cup (representing Great Britain & Ireland): 2007
Bonallack Trophy (representing Europe): 2008 (winners)

Professional
World Cup (representing England): 2013
EurAsia Cup (representing Europe): 2016 (winners)
Ryder Cup (representing Europe) : 2016

Ryder Cup points record

See also
2008 European Tour Qualifying School graduates
List of golfers with most European Tour wins

References

External links

Danny Willett's Junior Championship at Bondhay Golf Club

English male golfers
Jacksonville State Gamecocks men's golfers
European Tour golfers
PGA Tour golfers
Winners of men's major golf championships
Ryder Cup competitors for Europe
Olympic golfers of Great Britain
Golfers at the 2016 Summer Olympics
Sportspeople from Sheffield
1987 births
Living people